This Delicate Thing We've Made is the third studio album by Australian singer-songwriter Darren Hayes. It is a double album that was released on his own label Powdered Sugar on 20 August 2007. The first single from the album, "On the Verge of Something Wonderful", was released in Australia on 28 July 2007 and in the UK and online on 6 August 2007.

Background
The album has been made with the help of a 1982 Fairlight CMI synthesizer, and the ex-Savage Garden frontman has said it is a cinematic and theatrical album. It reached number 5 on the Top Albums chart of the Australian iTunes Store on the day of release and number 3 later in its first week. Hayes later said of the album in a 2011 interview that "it was my rebellious streak. It was a strange 25-song double album with only one or two songs that could be played on the radio. It was a bit sobering."

Hayes released a companion DVD, This Delicate Film We've Made, containing music videos for fifteen of the songs on the album, with the audio remastered in 5.1 surround sound. A number of the videos were animations in which Hayes did not appear.

Singles
 "On the Verge of Something Wonderful" was released as the album's first official single on 1 July 2007, with the music video premiering on 9 July. A short clip of the song had previously been revealed in an album teaser on Hayes' official website.
 "Me, Myself and (I)" was revealed the album's second single in a blog entry on 4 August 2007. The music video was released on 25 September 2007. A short clip of the song had previously been revealed in an album teaser on Hayes' official website.
 "Casey" became the album's third and final single in March 2008, and was backed by a plethora of B-sides and remixes on various digital bundles, none of which featured the original version of the song. The partly animated music video was released in December 2007.

"Step into the Light" was first revealed via an album teaser on Hayes' official website and MySpace profile. On 14 May 2007, Hayes released an animated video for the song, and in June 2007, a promotional remix EP was released to clubs in the United States in promotion of the album. The single was only issued promotionally. "Who Would Have Thought" was released as a promotional single alongside the release of "Me, Myself and (I)". The song was accompanied by an animated video, which was premiered as a teaser on his official website, as well as his Myspace profile, on 9 April 2007. The track was co-written with Guy Chambers.

Charts
This Delicate Thing We've Made spent just two weeks in the Australian top 50 and the UK top 75: it entered the Australian Albums Top 50 at No. 19 before falling to No. 38 the following week, and entered the UK Albums Chart at No. 14 before falling to No. 72 the following week.

Track listing

This Delicate Film We've Made DVD
 A Fear of Falling Under
 Who Would Have Thought
 Waking the Monster
 How to Build a Time Machine
 Neverland
 Step into the Light
 Casey
 Setting Sun
 Words
 A Hundred Challenging Things a Boy Can Do
 Maybe
 A Conversation With God
 Bonus Music Videos
 On the Verge of Something Wonderful
 Me, Myself and (I)

Charts

References

2007 albums
Darren Hayes albums
Electronica albums by Australian artists